Novo Miloševo is a village located in the Novi Bečej municipality, in the Central Banat District of Serbia. It is situated in the Province of Vojvodina. The village has a Serb majority (76.09%) with an ethnic Hungarian minority (14.57%). Its population is 6,763 people as of the 2002 census.

Name
The village was formed after the Second World War when former villages of Beodra and Dragutinovo were joined into one single village known as Novo Miloševo. Before 1918, Dragutinovo was known as Karlovo.

History

The former village of Beodra was first mentioned in 1331. It was established at present-day location from 1742–53, and was settled by Serbs from Potisje and Pomorišje. The village of Karlovo was established in 1751 by former Serb frontiersmen. In 1918, the name of the village was changed from Karlovo to Dragutinovo, after Dragutin Ristić, a colonel in the Serbian army, whose unit occupied the village. In 1946, Dragutinovo and Beodra were joined into one single village known as Novo Miloševo, after Miloš Popov Klima, a noted Partisan who was born in Dragutinovo.

Historical population

1961: 9,276
1971: 8,548
1981: 7,805
1991: 7,308
2002: 6,763

People
Ranko Žeravica, Yugoslav and Serbian basketball coach

See also
List of places in Serbia
List of cities, towns and villages in Vojvodina

References
Slobodan Ćurčić, Broj stanovnika Vojvodine, Novi Sad, 1996.

External links
Novo Miloševo - Official Internet Presentation
Novo Miloševo - Aerial photos
Novo Miloševo - First site

Gallery

Populated places in Serbian Banat